Ayvu Rapyta is a book written in the Mbya Guarani language and compiled by Paraguayan anthropologist León Cadogan.  Cadogan records the myths and religious tradition of the Mbyá Guaraní of the Guairá Department of Paraguay as told him by, among others, Cacique Pablo Vera.

The book's full title is Ayvu Rapyta: Textos míticos de los Mbya-Guarani and was first published in 1959.  It is considered to be one of the most fundamental works on the Guarani people.

One of the most important concepts explained in this work is that of the founding of the human language or the "Ayvu Rapyta."  The father, Ñamandu, by virtue of his creative wisdom, or kuaarara, conceived the origins of the human tongue even before the existence of the world.  

The book also chronicles the plans of various other spirits to create the first earth (Yvy Tenonde) which was later destroyed by flood to be replaced by the new earth (Yvy Pyaú).  Also explained is the origin of all living persons and their word-souls (Ñe'êy).

Cadogan also compiled from his Mbyá associates various songs, prayers and rites essential to indigenous religious life as well as their ethical customs.

External links
 Various Excerpts in Guarani and Spanish.
 Article.
 Table of Contents.
 http://www.centopeia.net/traducoes/172/douglas-diegues/ayvu-rapyta—em-portunhol-selvagem-%5Bkapitulo-ii%5D/

Latin American folklore
Religious texts
Creation myths
Paraguayan books
South American folklore
1959 non-fiction books